Auberives-en-Royans is a commune in the Isère department in the Auvergne-Rhône-Alpes region of south-eastern France.

The inhabitants of the commune are known as Albaripains or Albaripaines.

Geography
Auberives-en-Royans is located at the foot of the Vercors plateau in the Isère valley some 19 km east of Romans-sur-Isère and 11 km south of Saint-Marcellin. The southern border of the commune is the border between Isère and Drôme departments. Access to the commune is by the D531 road which branches from the D1532 east of Saint-Nazaire-en-Royans which passes through the south of the commune and the village and continues along the southern border east to Pont-en-Royans. The D518 road comes from Saint-Romans in the north and passes down the eastern border of the commune to Pont-en-Royans. The commune has some forests in the north and the rest is farmland.

The southern border of the commune consists entirely of the Bourne river as it flows west to join the Isère at Saint-Nazaire-en-Royans. The Tarze river flows through the centre of the commune from the north and joins the Bourne near the village. The Canal de la Bourne starts in the south-west of the commune and flows through the commune parallel to the Bourne towards the Isère.

Neighbouring communes and villages

Administration

List of Successive Mayors

Demography
In 2017 the commune had 376 inhabitants.

Sites and monuments
A Church from the 19th century
A Fortified house

See also
Communes of the Isère department
Parc naturel régional du Vercors

References

External links
Auberives-en-Royans on Géoportail, National Geographic Institute (IGN) website 
Anberive en Royans on the 1750 Cassini Map

Communes of Isère
Dauphiné